Industrial democracy is an arrangement which involves workers making decisions, sharing responsibility and authority in the workplace. While in participative management organizational designs workers are listened to and take part in the decision-making process, in organizations employing industrial democracy they also have the final decisive power (they decide about organizational design and hierarchy as well).

In company law, the term generally used is co-determination, following the German word Mitbestimmung. In Germany, companies with more than 2000 employees (or more than 1000 employees in the coal and steel industries) have half of their supervisory boards of directors (which elect management) elected by the shareholders and half by the workers.

Although industrial democracy generally refers to the organization model in which workplaces are run directly by the people who work in them in place of private or state ownership of the means of production, there are also representative forms of industrial democracy. Representative industrial democracy includes decision-making structures such as the formation of committees and consultative bodies to facilitate communication between management, unions, and staff.

Rationale 
Advocates often point out that industrial democracy increases productivity and service delivery from a more fully engaged and happier workforce. Other benefits include less industrial dispute resulting from better communication in the workplace; improved and inclusive decision-making processes resulting in qualitatively better workplace decisions, decreased stress and increased well-being, an increase in job satisfaction, a reduction in absenteeism and an improved sense of fulfillment. Other authors regard industrial democracy as a consequence of citizenship rights.

Works councils and workers' participation 

At the point of production, the introduction of mandatory works councils and voluntary schemes of workers' participation (e.g. semi-autonomous groups) have a long tradition in European countries.<ref>Joel Rogers/Wolfgang Streeck (eds.): Works Councils. Consultation, Representation, and Cooperation in Industrial Relations, The University of Chicago Press, Chicago-London 1995. - Thomas Sandberg; 'Work Organization and Autonomous Groups, LiberFörlag, Uppsala 1982.</ref>

 Co-determination 

In a number of European countries, employees of a business take part in election of company directors. In Germany, the law is known as the Mitbestimmungsgesetz of 1976. In Britain a 1977 proposal for a similar system was named the Bullock Report.

 History 

The anarchist thinker Pierre-Joseph Proudhon used the term "industrial democracy" in the 1850s to describe the vision of workplace democracy he had first raised in the 1840s with What is Property? Or, an Inquiry into the Principle of Right and of Government, (management "must be chosen from the workers by the workers themselves, and must fulfil the conditions of eligibility.") He repeated this call in later works like General Idea of the Revolution.In late nineteenth century, and at the beginning of the twentieth century, industrial democracy, along with anarcho-syndicalism and new unionism, represented one of the dominant themes in revolutionary socialism and played a prominent role in international labour movements. The term industrial democracy was also used by British socialist reformers Sidney and Beatrice Webb in their 1897 book Industrial Democracy. The Webbs used the term to refer to trade unions and the process of collective bargaining.

While the influence of the movements promoting industrial democracy declined after the defeat of the anarchists in the Spanish Revolution in 1939, several unions and organizations advocating the arrangement continue to exist and are again on the rise internationally.

The Industrial Workers of the World advance an industrial unionism which would organize all the workers, regardless of skill, gender or race, into one big union divided into a series of departments corresponding to different industries. The industrial unions would be the embryonic form of future post-capitalist production. Once sufficiently organized, the industrial unions would overthrow capitalism by means of a general strike, and carry on production through worker run enterprises without bosses or the wage system. Anarcho-syndicalist unions, like the Confederación Nacional del Trabajo, are similar in their means and ends but organize workers into geographically based and federated syndicates rather than industrial unions.

The New Unionism Network also promotes workplace democracy as a means to linking production and economic democracy.

 Representative industrial democracy 

Modern industrial economies have adopted several aspects of industrial democracy to improve productivity and as reformist measures against industrial disputes. Often referred to as "teamworking", this form of industrial democracy has been practiced in Scandinavia, Germany, the Netherlands and the UK as well as in several Japanese companies such as Toyota, as an effective alternative to Taylorism.

The term is often used synonymously with workplace democracy, in which the traditional master-servant model of employment gives way to a participative, power-sharing model.

 See also 

 UK labour law and German labour law
 Workers' self-management
 Collective Bargaining
 Co-determination
 Industrial Relations
 Holacracy
 Industrial Workers of the World
 New unionism
 Socialist Party USA
 Social ownership
 League for Industrial Democracy
 Workers' council
 Workplace democracy
 Common ownership

 Notes 

 References 
Articles
 M Poole, 'Theories of Industrial Democracy: the Emerging Synthesis' (1982) 30(2) Sociological Review 181-207
 W Müller-Jentsch, Industrial Democracy: Historical Development and Current Challenges' (2007) 19 (4) Management Revue 260–273
E McGaughey, 'Votes at Work in Britain: Shareholder Monopolisation and the ‘Single Channel’' (2018) 47(1) Industrial Law Journal 76 

Books
 P Douglas, The Columbia Conserve Company: A Unique Experiment in Industrial Democracy (1925)
 P Blumberg, Industrial Democracy: The Sociology of Participation (1969)
 K Boyle, The UAW and the Heyday of American Liberalism, 1945-1968 (1995)
 M Derber, The American Idea of Industrial Democracy, 1865-1965 (1970)
 SM Lipset, M Trow and J Coleman, Union Democracy: The Inside Politics of the International Typographical Union (1977)
 JA McCartin, Labor's Great War: The Struggle for Industrial Democracy and the Origins of Modern American Labor Relations, 1912-1921 (1998)
 M Poole, Industrial Relations: Origins and Patterns of National Diversity (2008)
 M Poole, Workers' Participation in Industry (2nd edn 1978)
 BC Roberts (ed), Towards Industrial Democracy: Europe, Japan and the United States (1979)
 B Webb and S Webb. Industrial Democracy'' (1897)

External links 
 Mondragon Corporacion Cooperativa, Spain
 Economic and Industrial Democracy: An International Journal
 New Unionism Network 
 Industrial Democracy  A think-tank for the left.
 Socialist Industrial Unionism

Labor relations
Labour law
Corporate law
Organizational structure
Anti-capitalism
Socialism
Cooperatives
Types of democracy
Types of socialism